16 Altamont Terrace is a historic home in Cumberland, Allegany County, Maryland, United States. Built circa 1851, it is an example of Greek Revival architecture, with an Ionic portico above a stone foundation and cast iron balconies. The house served as the Allegany County hospital from 1889 to 1890. The building was converted into apartments in about 1905.

16 Altamont Terrace was listed on the National Register of Historic Places in 1975.

References

External links
, including undated photo, at Maryland Historical Trust

Houses on the National Register of Historic Places in Maryland
Greek Revival houses in Maryland
Houses in Allegany County, Maryland
Buildings and structures in Cumberland, Maryland
National Register of Historic Places in Allegany County, Maryland